KABY may refer to:

 KABY-LD, a low-power television station (channel 20, virtual 15) licensed to serve Sioux Falls, South Dakota, United States
 KABY-TV, a defunct television station (channel 9) formerly licensed to serve Aberdeen, South Dakota
 Southwest Georgia Regional Airport (ICAO code KABY)
 Aliu Djaló, Portuguese footballer nicknamed Kaby